Tarantula is the fifth and final studio album by the American punk rock band the Riverdales. It was released digitally on June 8, 2010 and was released on CD and vinyl on June 22, 2010 through Recess Records. It was the only Riverdales album to be released through Recess Records, as well as their only album featuring second guitarist Simon Lamb. Ben Weasel has stated that "If [he] had it [his] way, Tarantula would have been part two of a double album with Invasion USA." Tarantula is said to sound more "hardcore" due to the use of two guitars and features hard rock-styled guitar solos. After the album was recorded, Lamb left the band and was replaced by Drew Fredrichsen.

Track listing
"Bad Seed Baby" - 1:46
"The Beginning of the End" - 1:40
"Infection" - 1:39
"Diabolik" - 1:31
"Volcano" - 1:58
"The Girl in Lover's Lane" - 1:40
"Girls Town" - 2:06
"Soultaker" - 2:22
"12 to the Moon" - 1:46
"Crash of the Moons" - 3:15
"Stranded in Space" - 2:18
"I Don't Wanna Live Forever" - 1:43
"Master Ninja" - 2:35
"Time Chaser" - 3:21

Personnel
 Ben Foster - guitar, lead vocals
 Dan Schafer - bass, lead vocals
 Simon Lamb - guitar, backing vocals
 Adam Cargin - drums
 Drew Fredrichsen - lead guitar on track 3
 Justin Perkins - co-producer, engineer, mixing, mastering, additional guitar, vocals, keyboard, percussion

References

External links
 https://www.twitter.com/BenWeasel/status/14306171145
 http://www.recessrecords.com/_wordpress/?p=462
 https://www.amazon.com/Tarantula/dp/B003O3RUIK/ref=sr_shvl_album_2?ie=UTF8&qid=1275013264&sr=301-2

2010 albums
Riverdales albums